Central block may refer to:

Central Block (Pierre, South Dakota), a building in Pierre, South Dakota
Central nerve block, including epidural and spinal anaesthesia
Central Block, the grand coalition which ruled Portugal from 1983 to 1985
Centre Block, the main building of the Parliament of Canada